Carex duvaliana is a tussock-forming species of perennial sedge in the family Cyperaceae. It is native to southern parts of Japan and south eastern parts of China.

The species was first described in 1878 by the botanists Adrien René Franchet and Ludovic Savatier in 1878 as a part of the work Enumeratio Plantarum in Japonia Sponte Crescentium.

See also
List of Carex species

References

duvaliana
Taxa named by Adrien René Franchet
Taxa named by Ludovic Savatier
Plants described in 1878
Flora of Japan
Flora of China